Forced speech may refer to:

Compelled speech, statements that are coerced by legal means
Pressured speech, a medical condition

Freedom of expression